This is a list of the Maronite patriarchs of Antioch and all the East, the primate of the Maronite Church, one of the Eastern Catholic Churches. Starting with Paul Peter Massad in 1854, after becoming patriarch of the Maronite Catholic Patriarchate of Antioch, they assume the name "Peter" (Boutros in Arabic, بطرس ), after the traditional first Bishop of Antioch, St. Peter, who was also the head of the Apostles. The official title that the Maronite Patriarch assumes is "Patriarch of Antioch and All the East". To this date 15 patriarchs have been canonized by the Catholic Church, with an extra two being beatified but not yet canonized.

For the Patriarchs of Antioch before John Maron, see List of Patriarchs of Antioch.

List of Patriarchs of Antioch and all the Levant of the Maronite Church

A famous list of Maronite Patriarchs of Antioch was written and published by Giuseppe Simone Assemani, and Simon Awad, which follows the Series of Maronite Patriachs written by Patriarch Estephan El Douaihy in the 17th century, but it is incomplete for the first centuries. Besides the Assemani's list, another more detailed list was written in Bejjeh in 1766 by Georges Saad.

In the list here below the names shifted on the right are not included in the incomplete Assemani's list and derive from the Bejjeh list.

Patriarchs of Antioch before the Maronite-Greek schism, 1st century–686

Patriarchs during the Marada states, 686–1099

Patriarchs during the Crusades 1099–1305

Patriarchs during the Mamluk rule, 1305–1516

Patriarchs during the Ottomans, 1516–1918

Patriarch during modern Lebanon, 1918–present

Gallery

See also
List of Latin Patriarchs of Antioch
List of Melkite Greek Catholic Patriarchs of Antioch
List of Orthodox Patriarchs of Antioch – 518 to present day
List of Patriarchs of Antioch – beginning to 518

Notes

External links
List of all Maronite Patriarchs by GCatholic.org
[The Maronite Church Roots and Mission] By His Excellency Bishop Antoine Charbel Tarabay, Fr. Antoine Daou, Fr. Hani Mattar, Fr. Boulous Sfeir, Dr. Youssef Kamal El Haje and George Arab

Apostolic sees
Maronite Patriarchs
Maronite
Lebanon religion-related lists